Ululodes floridanus is a species of owlfly in the tribe Ululodini. It is found in North America.

References

Further reading

 

Myrmeleontidae
Insects described in 1906